Drepane is a genus of fishes known commonly as the sicklefishes. It is the only genus in the perciform fish family Drepaneidae. These fish occur in the Indian and western Pacific Oceans, and in the eastern Atlantic near Africa.

Species
The currently recognized species in this genus are:
Drepane africana Osório, 1892 – African sicklefish
Drepane longimana (Bloch & J. G. Schneider, 1801) – concertina fish
Drepane punctata (Linnaeus, 1758) – spotted sicklefish

See also
List of fish families

References

 
Ray-finned fish genera
Taxa named by Georges Cuvier